HD 110113, also known as TOI-755, is a Sun-like star with a distance from the Solar System of about  and located in the Centaurus constellation. A planetary system was discovered orbiting this star in 2021.

Characteristics
HD 110113 has been classified as a G-type main-sequence star (yellow dwarf).

Planetary system
The two planets that are orbiting TOI-755, TOI-755b and TOI-755c, were suspected since 2021.

References

Planetary systems with one confirmed planet
G-type main-sequence stars
110113
061820
Durchmusterung objects
Centaurus (constellation)
0755